Tortuguilla Island (Isla Tortuguilla) is a small island in the Caribbean Sea off the northern coast of Colombia. It is located about 9 km from the mainland, at coordinates 09 ° 01'50 "N 76 ° 20'40" O. Administratively it belongs to the Córdoba department, in the municipality of Puerto Escondido.

Geography
Tortuguilla is a landmass subfossil coral terrace surrounded by a limestone platform about 10 feet deep that is home to numerous coral reefs.

See also
 Caribbean region of Colombia
 Insular region of Colombia
 List of islands of South America

References

External links
 Isla Tortuguilla. La Tierra.

Caribbean islands of Colombia